9th National Board of Review Awards
December 30, 1937
The 9th National Board of Review Awards for American cinema were announced on 30 December 1937.

Best American Films
Night Must Fall
The Life of Emile Zola
Black Legion
Camille
Make Way for Tomorrow
The Good Earth
They Won't Forget
Captains Courageous
A Star Is Born
Stage Door

Top Foreign Films
The Eternal Mask
The Lower Depths
Baltic Deputy
Mayerling
The Spanish Earth
Golgotha
Elephant Boy
Jánošík
The Wedding of Palo

Winners
Best American Film: Night Must Fall
Best Foreign Film: Die ewige Maske (The Eternal Mask), Austria/Switzerland
Best Acting:
Harry Baur - Golgotha
Humphrey Bogart - Black Legion
Charles Boyer - Conquest
Nikolai Cherkassov - Baltic Deputy
Danielle Darrieux - Mayerling
Greta Garbo - Camille
Robert Montgomery - Night Must Fall
Maria Ouspenskaya - Conquest
Luise Rainer - The Good Earth
Joseph Schildkraut - The Life of Emile Zola
Dame May Whitty - Night Must Fall
Mathias Wieman - ''The Eternal Mask

Notes

External links
National Board of Review of Motion Pictures :: Awards for 1937

1937
1937 film awards
1937 in American cinema